The 2020 Baptist Health 200 was the 5th stock car race of the 2020 NASCAR Gander RV & Outdoors Truck Series season, and the 25th iteration of the event. The race was held on Saturday, June 13, 2020 in Homestead, Florida at Homestead–Miami Speedway, a  permanent oval-shaped racetrack. The race took 134 laps to complete. At the end, Kyle Busch of Kyle Busch Motorsports would cruise on the final restart to win the race, the 58th of his career in the NASCAR Gander RV & Outdoors Truck Series and the 2nd of the season. To fill the podium, Tyler Ankrum of GMS Racing and Ross Chastain of Niece Motorsports would finish 2nd and 3rd, respectively.

Background 

Homestead-Miami Speedway is a motor racing track located in Homestead, Florida. The track, which has several configurations, has promoted several series of racing, including NASCAR, the NTT IndyCar Series and the Grand-Am Rolex Sports Car Series

From 2002 to 2019, Homestead-Miami Speedway has hosted the final race of the season in all three of NASCAR's series: the NASCAR Cup Series, Xfinity Series and Gander RV & Outdoors Truck Series.

Entry list 

*Withdrew due to the team not passing technical inspection. This would cause Tim Viens to cut ties with Mike Affarano Motorsports, saying "I did everything I was supposed to do. Secured the ride with the team, Mike Affarano Motorsports. Did everything financially I was supposed to do. Paid for the ride. I paid for all of the hotels. I bought three sets of sticker tires today before the race, that was $6,500. I paid for a first-class pit crew that was $3,500. I paid $2,000 for the transporter to get down here. Everything I was supposed to do. I was at the track, and was ready to go. This sucks. It really sucks.”

**Driver switched to Ray Ciccarelli.

**Withdrew the car after Bayley Currey, who was originally supposed to drive the #49, left the team. Currey would leave the team due to Ray Ciccarelli's announcement that his team would leave NASCAR after the league banned the Confederate flag, causing major controversy on the team and Ciccarelli. Currey would later confirm he left in a reply to a question on Twitter. As a result, Ciccarelli would drive the #49.

Starting lineup 
The starting lineup was based on a random draw. As a result, Austin Hill of Hattori Racing Enterprises won the pole.

Race results 
Stage 1 Laps: 40

Stage 2 Laps: 40

Stage 3 Laps: 54

References 

2020 NASCAR Gander RV & Outdoors Truck Series
NASCAR races at Homestead-Miami Speedway
June 2020 sports events in the United States
2020 in sports in Florida